Stefan Priebe  (born 1953 in West-Berlin) is a German-British psychologist and psychiatrist.

Early life 
Priebe grew up in West-Berlin, completed school at the Canisius-Kolleg and studied psychology and medicine at the University of Hamburg. He later qualified as psychiatrist, neurologist and psychotherapist in Berlin, where he trained and worked at the Free University Berlin.

Career 
Priebe was Head of the Department of Social Psychiatry at the Free University Berlin until 1997, when he became Professor of Social and Community Psychiatry at Queen Mary, University of London. He is currently the head of the Unit for Social and Community Psychiatry, a World Health Organization collaborating centre based in the London Borough of Newham.

Research 
He has authored and co-authored over 800 peer-reviewed scientific papers.

Mental consequences of political persecution and war 
After the re-unification of Germany in 1989, he studied mental consequences of political persecution in East-Germany. The findings were cited in the German legislation for compensating the victims of political imprisonment.  Later, he led studies that described lasting mental disorders in survivors of the wars in the Balkans, both refugees and those who stayed in the conflict zone, particularly in those who had experienced human rights violations.

Assessing views and experiences of psychiatric patients 
Priebe investigated the treatment experiences of patients with mental disorders and authored several scales for assessing their views and appraisals. These scales include the Manchester Short Assessment for Quality of Life, Clients Assessment of Treatment Scale, the Helping Alliance Scale, and the Scale for Assessing Therapeutic Relationships in Community Mental Health Care.

Advancing psycho-social treatment (DIALOG+) 
He led on randomised controlled trials testing psycho-social interventions in mental health care, e.g. body psychotherapy, music therapy dialectical behaviour therapy, financial incentives to improve medication adherence, and befriending through volunteers. In particular, he developed DIALOG+, which aims to make routine patient-clinician meetings therapeutically effective.

Global Mental Health 
Between 2017-2022, Priebe was the Director of the Global Health Research Group on Developing Psychosocial Interventions for Mental Health Care, funded by the National Institute for Health Research in the United Kingdom. The Group conducted studies in Argentina, Bosnia-Herzegovina, Colombia, Pakistan, Peru and Uganda.

Since 2019, he has been leading a research programme funded by the Medical Research Council that assesses how young people in Bogotá, Lima and Buenos Aires overcome episodes of mental distress. Partners in the programme are Javeriana Universidad in Bogotá, the Universidad de Buenos Aires, the Universidad Peruana Cayetano Heredia in Lima and the arts organisations Fundación Batuta (Bogotá), Crear Vale La Pena (Buenos Aires) and Teatro a Plaza (Lima).

Conceptual work 
Since 2010, Priebe has published and lectured on a social paradigm in psychiatry, which regards mental disorders as a social phenomenon and focuses on social interactions in society and in treatments for reducing mental distress.

References

External links 
 
 

1953 births
Living people
Place of birth missing (living people)
German psychologists
German psychiatrists
British psychologists
British psychiatrists
Academic staff of the Free University of Berlin
Academics of Queen Mary University of London
Physicians from Berlin
German emigrants to the United Kingdom